Uummannaq may refer to the following areas in Greenland, from north to south:
Murchison Sound
 Uummannaq, an Inuit settlement near the former settlements of Dundas and Pituffik near Thule Air Base, all three today abandoned
 Sugar Loaf Island, an island in the northern part of Upernavik Archipelago in northwestern Greenland
 Uummannaq Fjord, a large fjord in northwestern Greenland
 Uummannaq Island, an island in the above fjord
 Uummannaq (mountain), a mountain on Uummannaq Island
 Uummannaq, a town on Uummannaq Island
 Umanak (mission), a Moravian mission up-fjord from Nuuk in mid-western Greenland